Herbert Welch (born 1912) was an English footballer who played as a goalkeeper for Rochdale, as well as non-league football for various other clubs.

References

English footballers
Rochdale A.F.C. players
Bangor City F.C. players
Bacup Borough F.C. players
Mossley A.F.C. players
1912 births

Year of death missing